Vishnu Vardhan Induri is an Indian film producer known for his works in Telugu cinema, Tamil cinema, and bollywood. He owns the media production house "Vibri Media" and is the founder of Celebrity Cricket League, and South Indian International Movie Awards.

Early life
Vishnu Induri was born in Andhra Pradesh into a Telugu speaking family. He holds Masters Degree in computer science from Illinois Institute of Technology

Filmography
Producer

References

Film producers from Andhra Pradesh
Tamil film producers
Businesspeople from Hyderabad, India
Illinois Institute of Technology alumni
Indian emigrants to the United States
Engineers from Andhra Pradesh
Businesspeople in software
Telugu film producers
Hindi film producers
Living people
Telugu people
Year of birth missing (living people)